Alexandros Piastopoulos (born 14 March 1996) is a Greek professional footballer who plays as a midfielder for Super League 2 club Egaleo.

Honours
Volos
Gamma Ethniki: 2017–18

References

1996 births
Living people
Greek footballers
Greece youth international footballers
Greek expatriate footballers
Championnat National 3 players
Super League Greece 2 players
Football League (Greece) players
Gamma Ethniki players
Volos N.F.C. players
PAE Kerkyra players
Trikala F.C. players
Association football midfielders
Footballers from Thessaloniki